Ordinary People and Independent Personalities is a conservative political party in Slovakia. The anti-establishment party founded in 2011 won the 2020 parliamentary election on an anti-corruption platform. After getting in charge, OĽaNO adopted a generally conservative outlook. The party is led by former prime minister of Slovakia Igor Matovič. The incumbent prime minister was a member of the party presidium, Eduard Heger, succeeding Matovič in 2021.

History
The four Ordinary People (OĽaNO) MPs were Igor Matovič, Erika Jurinová, Martin Fecko, Jozef Viskupič. OĽaNO sat in the National Council with the SaS and signed an agreement with the SaS that its members could not cross the floor to another group.  In June and July 2010, it was rumoured that OĽaNO would refuse to back the programme of the new centre-right coalition, which included Freedom and Solidarity, and whose majority depended on Ordinary People.

In August 2010, Matovič said that it was not the right time to become an independent party. However, on 28 October 2011, Ordinary People filed a formal party registration, while Matovič announced that the party would compete in 2012 parliamentary election as a separate electoral list, of independents and representatives of the Civic Conservative Party and the Conservative Democrats. In the 2012 election, the party came in third place overall, winning 8.55% of the vote and 16 seats.

In the 2014 European elections, OĽaNO came in fourth place nationally, receiving 7.46% of the vote and electing 1 MEP.

In the 2016 parliamentary election, Ordinary People ran in alliance with New Majority. They received 11.02% votes in Slovakia and consequently 19 MPs in the Slovak Parliament, 17 of whom came from Ordinary People.

In 2014–2019, the party was member of European Parliament group of European Conservatives and Reformists and in 2019 switched to the European People's Party group.

At the February 2020 parliamentary election, the Party received 25.0% of the vote, winning a 53 of 150 seats in the National Council. Party leader Igor Matovič was appointed as the Prime Minister designate.

Ideology and platform
Initially a big tent populist party, it eventually adopted a generally conservative outlook while maintaining its anti-corruption and anti-elitist rhetoric. Although conservative voices were always present in OĽaNO, their influence became significant after the 2020 parliamentary election. Party leader Igor Matovič endorsed the 2015 Slovak referendum initiated by Alliance for Family, voting against the introduction of same-sex marriages, adoptions and compulsory sex education in state schools. Before the last election, Matovič announced that his party would not join a coalition government that wanted to establish civil unions or loosen drug policy. At the same time, Christian Union merged into the party, presenting bills restricting abortions with major party support.  

OĽaNO lacks any internal democratic structures, and Matovič decides on the composition of the electoral list, admission of members, political nominations and he is irremovable. The use of public subsidies for the party is considered non-transparent and similar to a private company rather than a political entity. OĽaNO claimed to have 50 members as of 31 December 2021.

Election results

National Council

European Parliament

Presidential

Notes

References 

Conservative parties in Slovakia
Populist parties
Freedom and Solidarity breakaway groups
Political parties established in 2011
2011 establishments in Slovakia